Sainik School Sujanpur Tihra is a Sainik School (army school) in the town of Tira Sujanpur, Hamirpur district in the state of Himachal Pradesh, India.

The aim of the school is to prepare boys academically, physically and mentally for entry into NDA and other walks of life. A sound character, team spirit, a patriotic outlook and a desire to serve the country with dedication are the qualities promoted by all the Sainik School.

Overview 
Sainik Schools were set up on the lines of Public Schools and were designed to cater the needs of the common masses who could not afford to send their wards to elite but expensive public schools. Sainik School Sujanpur Tihra (HP), a purely residential school, was set up to cater to the needs of the people of Himachal Pradesh and was inaugurated by His Excellency Shri Neelam Sanjeeva Reddy, the President of India on 2 November 1978. He said, "A fine Institution. My best wishes for its progress".

Sujanpur Tihra is located 24 km from its district HQ Hamirpur and is connected to all other places in the State by road. Its nearest broad gauge railhead is located 99 km away at Una.

A narrow gauge train operates between Pathankot and Maranda (Palampur) which is 45 km away. Kangra Airport at Gaggal is located 75 km from Sujanpur Tihra.

The school has extensive playground with lush green silken grass, which looks splendid against the Dhauladhar ranges and Baradari hill. The school has independent NCC unit and NCC is compulsory for all students from VI to XI standards. Sports facilities exist in Football, Hockey, Volleyball, Handball & Basketball besides other minor & indoor games.

The school has three Service Officers i.e. Principal, Head Master and Registrar deputed by Ministry of Defence and 50 experienced set of teaching and administrative staff together with 52 support staff for effective management of school activities. In addition, one JCO and three NCO's from Army are appointed for NCC & Sports activities in the school.

Admissions 
Sainik school Sujanpur Tihra admits boys from Classes VI & IX. The age of the applicants should be between 10 and 11 years for class VI and the age should be 13-14 for class IX as on 1 July of the year in which admission is sought.

The candidates applying for the admissions in Sujanpur Tihra need to undergo entrance examination for admission to class VI & IX. The written test is followed by interview. Only those candidates who qualify in the written examination are called for interview keeping in view the number of vacancies available.

The medical test is also conducted and the admission to these classes is subject to the candidates being found medically fit. There are certain medical standards prescribed for entry to National Defence Academy and the candidates need to pass the fitness test. However the administration ignores factors like height and weight which are variable.

Buildings 
Main building:
Facing the lush green rectangular ground, is the main academic building which houses both, the primary and the secondary wing. It has three levels. The ground level holds the primary wing (also known as Sainik Primary School) i.e., up to grade 5 and other offices including authorities' offices. The first level consists mostly of classrooms for senior wing. The second level has the library, NCC store, the Biology laboratory and the assembly hall that can accommodate almost over 550 people.
Hostel:School has 6 hostels named after rivers flowing in Himachal Pradesh.
Every hostel has a Video Room for students.
School has Cadets Mess with two blocks named after Field Marshal Cariappa and Field Marshal Manekshaw.
School has residential complex for teachers and their families.
School has in-house MI Room.
School campus has many 5 football grounds, 2 hockey fields, 1 handball grounds, an athletic track, 4 Basketball courts, 1 lawn tennis courts, a squash court and a swimming pool and 4 badminton court.
Currently the school building is in dire need of repairs due to successive governments apathy and lack of funds.

Academics 
At Sainik School Sujanpur Tihra, academic excellence is given prime importance. Special efforts are made to create and maintain academic environment in the school. Cadets are encouraged to ‘Explore and Learn’ in addition to classroom teaching.

Examinations are conducted at regular intervals to ensure continuous study and also as feed back mechanism on the progress made by the cadets in each subject. The cadets are awarded various torches as recognition to their efforts put in during the entire session as per the following criteria:
 90% and above 	: 	GOLD TORCH
 85% and above 	: 	SILVER TORCH
 80% and above 	: 	BRONZE TORCH
 First in Class 	: 	TORCH-FIRST IN CLASS
 Second in Class 	: 	TORCH-SECOND IN CLASS

Extra-curricular activities 
Science Clubs, Music Club, Literary Club, Photography, G.K Club. Karate club, Trackers, English literature, yoga etc. are functioning at present in the school under the guidance of expert and experienced teachers.

Physical Training, Cross Country and Games-Hockey, Football, Athletics, Basketball, Handball and Volleyball are compulsory for all boys. While greater emphasis is laid on the academic progress of the students, the school provides ample scope for the development of their creative faculties and skill in Fine Arts, Craft and other hobbies. The school has also introduced an obstacle course to test and improve courage, physical endurance and physique of the students. Regularly cultural evenings etc. are organized between the hostels. Water sports, Mountaineering etc. is done on regular intervals.

Sports 
The Sainik Schools provides maximum opportunities for the cadets to participate in games in the following categories.
 Seniors : 10th to 12th
 Juniors : 7th to 9th

The games are divided into major and minor events.
 Major Events: Football, Hockey, Volleyball, Basketball, handball and athletic.
 Minor Events: Table-Tennis, squash, Badminton, Lawn Tennis, Mass, P.T, etc.

Participation:
 Sainik school Sujanpur Tihra participates In north zone inter Sainik Schools Competition and in inter zonal sports competition.
 S.S.S.T. also participates in Indian Public school meet.
 C.B.S.E. cluster meet.
 H.P. State tournament.

Inter House matches, athletics, PT, cross country etc. are conducted to develop the sportsmanship spirit, moral & character building, and make the cadets mentally and physically strong.
The school has various indoor and outdoor facilities for the cadets to make them mentally and physically tough.

References

External links
 Official website of Alumni Organisation
 Official website of Sainik School Sujanpur Tihra
 Official website of OBA

Sainik schools
Schools in Hamirpur district, Himachal Pradesh
Educational institutions established in 1978
1978 establishments in Himachal Pradesh